Tulsa Roughnecks may refer to any of four distinct professional soccer teams:

Tulsa Roughnecks (1978–1984), the original top-flight team that played in the North American Soccer League from 1978 to 1984.
Tulsa Roughnecks (1993–2000), the team that played in United Soccer Leagues from 1993 to 1999.
Tulsa Roughnecks (W-League), the team played in the USL's W-League in 1995
FC Tulsa, a USL pro team that began play in 2015 as Tulsa Roughnecks FC